Hershel Shanks (March 8, 1930 – February 5, 2021) was an American lawyer and amateur biblical archaeologist.  He was the founder and long-time editor of the Biblical Archaeology Review. For more than forty years, Shanks communicated the world of biblical archaeology to general readers through magazines, books, and conferences. Shanks was "probably the world's most influential amateur Biblical archaeologist," according to The New York Times book critic Richard Bernstein.

Life and career
Shanks was born in Sharon, Pennsylvania, where his father owned a shoe store. He graduated from Haverford College (English), Columbia University (sociology) and Harvard Law School. After over three decades of legal practice, he became interested in archaeology during a year spent in Jerusalem.

In 1974, he founded the Biblical Archaeology Society and in 1975 the Biblical Archaeology Review, which he edited until transitioning to Editor Emeritus in 2018. He has written and edited numerous works on biblical archaeology. He used the pseudonym "Adam Mikaya" for a few articles published in the Biblical Archaeology Review. He also wrote works on the Dead Sea Scrolls.

In a legal case before the Israeli Supreme Court in 1993, Shanks and others were successfully sued by leading Dead Sea Scrolls scholar Elisha Qimron for breach of copyright when Shanks, without permission, published material written by Qimron in A Facsimile Edition of the Dead Sea Scrolls. In 2000, Shanks' appeal of the earlier decision was dismissed.

Shanks was the editor of Moment Magazine for 15 years from 1987.

His television appearances included Who Wrote the Bible? (1996), The Naked Archaeologist (2005), and Mysteries of the Bible.

Shanks died from complications of COVID-19 at his home in Washington, D.C., on February 5, 2021, one month and three days short of his 91st birthday.

Works

Books

Edited by
 
 
 Hershel Shanks, editor, Early Israel, Biblical Archaeology Society 1990, 
 Hershel Shanks, editor, Christianity and Rabbinic Judaism: A Parallel History of Their Origins and Early Development, Biblical Archaeology Society 1992, 
 Hershel Shanks, editor, Understanding the Dead Sea Scrolls: A Reader From the Biblical Archaeology Review, Vintage Press reprint 1993, 
 Hershel Shanks and Suzanne F. Singer, editors, Cancel My Subscription: The Best of Queries and Comments from Letters to Biblical Archaeology Review, Biblical Archaeology Society 1995, 
 Hershel Shanks, editor, Abraham & Family: New Insights into the Patriarchal Narratives, Biblical Archaeology Society 2000, 
 Hershel Shanks, editor, City of David: Revisiting Early Excavations, English translations of Reports by Raymond Weill and Louis-Hugues Vincent, Notes and Comments by Ronny Reich, Biblical Archaeology Society 2004,

Memoir

References

External links
 Biblical Archaeology Review 
  Biblical Archaeology Society

1930 births
2021 deaths
20th-century American writers
20th-century American archaeologists
21st-century American archaeologists
American magazine editors
Archaeology of Israel
Biblical archaeologists
Dead Sea Scrolls
Deaths from the COVID-19 pandemic in Washington, D.C.
People from Sharon, Pennsylvania
Journalists from Pennsylvania
Writers from Pennsylvania
Academics from Pennsylvania
Haverford College alumni
Columbia University alumni
Harvard Law School alumni